Nagarao is an island situated in the Visayan Sea, a major fishing ground in the Philippines. Most of the families in Nagarao Island depend on fishing.

The island is becoming a developing tourist destination, since Nagarao Island is surrounded by white sand beaches and has three sandbars. There are no regular or scheduled boat trips to Nagarao, however, chartered motorized bangka are always docked in Barangay Pasiagon, Placer for people to travel to Nagarao Island.

The whole island is administered by the local government of Barangay Nagarao, under the jurisdiction of the municipality of Placer, Masbate. Nagarao Island  with its neighboring islands, Guin-awayan and Naboctot, are declared ecotourism zones through House Bill 8726. 

Nagarao has one public school, Nagarao Elementary School.

See also
•	List of islands by population density

References 

 Islands of Masbate
 Beaches of the Philippines